The 2022–23 Hong Kong Third Division League is the 9th season of Hong Kong Third Division since it became the fourth-tier football league in Hong Kong in 2014–15.

Teams

Changes from last season

From Third Division

Promoted to Second Division
 3 Sing
 Kowloon Cricket Club
 Sai Kung
 Wing Go

Withdrew
 Heng Wah

League table

References

Hong Kong Third Division League seasons
2022–23 in Hong Kong football